Shriek is the fourth studio album by indie band Wye Oak. It was released on April 29, 2014, by Merge Records in the United States and City Slang in Europe.

The album peaked at number 67 on the US Billboard 200.

Production
The album was produced by French producer Nicolas Vernhes at the Rare Book Room Studios in Brooklyn.

Release
On January 30, 2014, Wye Oak announced the release of their fourth studio album, along with the single, "The Tower".

Singles
The first single from the album, "The Tower" was released on January 30, 2014. The single has been described as a "pretty melancholy track with Jenn Wasner’s smoky but downtrodden voice and the dark, pulsating synths." In a review of the single, Chad Jewett of Half Cloth explained that it "offers a dub-like mélange of skittering drums and keyboard slabs. A rusted cello creaks in the background, dappling the already slightly ominous minor key burner with rustic gloom." Andy Stack, who has routinely pulled double-duty on drums and keyboard, offers a choppy back-and-fourth[sic] between the two, treating the song’s whorling organ with percussive menace, till it’s almost part of the kit.

The second single "Glory" was released on March 18, 2014. Jamieson Cox from Pitchfork said the single "is nervy, charged music, buzzing like a brain in heat." While explaining Wasner had a "palpable uptick" in her voice and in the stickiness of its rhythmic hook." Kyle McGovern from Spin explained the single has a "high-minded groove that benefits from Wasner’s heavenly vocals and a brief detour into itchy, electronic instrumentation."

Music videos
The official music video for "The Tower" was released on April 3, 2014, and directed by American filmmaker Ben O'Brien. The video features two dancing painters pirouetting through city streets and warehouses.

On April 30, 2014, the music video for "Glory" was released, and directed by Michael Patrick O'Leary and Ashley North Compton. The video has been described as "bizarre", as it features everyday items turning into "creepy pieces of symbolism". Director Ashley North Compton explained the reason behind the "cryptic visuals": "The video explores an internal and external power struggle and a fear of loss of control—through the lens of youth, anxiety, ease, and tension. The narrative follows youth-oriented themes, colors, styles and struggles with jarring and uncomfortable characters and movements."

Critical reception
Shriek was met with "generally favorable" reviews from critics. At Metacritic, which assigns a weighted average rating out of 100 to reviews from mainstream publications, this release received an average score of 76 based on 24 reviews. Aggregator Album of the Year gave the release a 74 out of 100 based on a critical consensus of 21 reviews.

Tim Sendra of AllMusic said: "The album is built around swooning banks of synths, bleeping key-based melodies, Stack's choppy drum patterns and programs, and Wasner's bouncy basslines." While also noting, the vocals of Jenn Wasner are her "most powerful and varied yet". Jon Hadusek said their album "feels like a natural progression for Wasner and Stack, with the synths handling the same rhythms and higher register melodies once reserved for the guitars. Shriek is a successful reinvention and hopefully a prelude of things to come as the band embarks on its new life."

Accolades

Track listing

Personnel
Credits adapted from Tidal and the album's liner notes.

 Jenn Wasner – vocals, bass, keyboards, programming, production, engineering
 Andy Stack - drums, keyboards, upright bass, programming, guitar, production, engineering
 Nicolas Vernhes – engineering, mixing, production
 Joe Lambert – mastering
 Gabe Wax – engineering assistance
 Ashley North Compton – cover layout

Charts

References 

2014 albums
Wye Oak albums
City Slang albums
Merge Records albums